SS Empire Brigade was a  cargo ship that was built in 1912 as SS Hannington Court. She served through the First World War and was sold in 1936 to Achille Lauro, who renamed her Elios. In 1940 when Italy declared war on France and the United Kingdom she was interned by the UK as a war prize and taken over by the Ministry of War Transport (MoWT), which renamed her Empire Brigade.

Building
The shipyards of Sir John Priestman & Co Ltd, Southwick, Sunderland built the ship in 1912. She was launched as Hannington Court on 10 October 1902 and completed in November 1912. These fed a single three-cylinder triple-expansion steam engine built by Blair and Co Ltd of Stockton-on-Tees.

Peacetime career
Hannington Court was built for Philip Haldinstein (later Haldin), who registered her in London. Haldinstein gave all his ships names that ended in "Court", and his company was known as Court Line. In 1936 Haldinstein set up a new company, the United British Steamship Co, and sold Hannington Court to Achille Lauro's Flota Lauro, which renamed her Elios and registered her in Naples.

On 10 June 1940 Italy declared war on France and the UK and invaded France. Elios was in port in Newcastle, where the UK authorities seized her as a war prize. The Ministry of War Transport, renamed her Empire Brigade, registered her in Newcastle and appointed Cairns, Noble & Co Ltd to manage her.

Wartime career and loss
In October 1940 Empire Brigade, with Sydney Parks as her master, loaded a cargo of 750 tons of copper, 129 tons of ferrous alloys and 980 tons of steel at Montreal in Canada and then sailed to Sydney, Nova Scotia where she joined Convoy SC 7 which was bound for Liverpool. Empire Brigades cargo was bound for Leith via the Tyne.

The convoy left Sydney on 5 October 1940, initially with only one escort ship, the  sloop . A wolf pack of U-boats found the convoy on 16 October and quickly overwhelmed it, sinking many ships over the next few days. Out of a complement of 41, five crew members and one DEMS gunner were killed.

The   rescued her master and 34 crew members and landed them at Greenock. Those killed on Empire Brigade are commemorated at the Tower Hill Memorial in London.

References

 

1912 ships
Empire ships
Maritime incidents in October 1940
Merchant ships of Italy
Ministry of War Transport ships
Ships sunk by German submarines in World War II
Steamships of Italy
Steamships of the United Kingdom
Ships built on the River Wear
World War I merchant ships of the United Kingdom
World War II shipwrecks in the Atlantic Ocean